The Vermont Department of Corrections is an executive agency of the U.S. state of Vermont charged with overseeing correctional facilities, supervising probation and parolees, and serving in an advisory capacity in the prevention of crime and juvenile delinquency. It is a part of the Vermont Agency of Human Services.

The agency is headquartered at the Waterbury State Office Complex in Waterbury, Vermont.

Nicholas J. Deml was appointed commissioner by Vermont Governor Phil Scott in November 2021. Deml replaced interim commissioner Jim Baker, who served from December 2019 until October 2021.

State prison facilities
As of 2018, the Vermont Department of Corrections manages the operations of six prison facilities in the state of Vermont. There were 1,334 prisoners in the system in 2022.

Vermont's former Dale Women's Facility in Waterbury, Vermont closed in early 2009.  State officials were considering closing the Caledonia Community Work Camp in St. Johnsbury, adjacent to the Northeast Regional Correctional Facility, in March 2016 because of underpopulation.

While security is handled by state employees, services, such as health services, have been contracted out.  There are 600 corrections officers.

The State of Vermont contracted with Corrections Corporation of America to house inmates in out-of-state private prisons beginning in the mid-1990s, and has continued the practice.  About 110 prisoners are held outside the state of Vermont. These prisoners cost half as much as the prisoners in state because of the economies of scale in larger prisons, and because only healthy prisoners are exported.

In the past, the State of Vermont held prisoners at the Lee Adjustment Center in Beattyville, Kentucky  (now closed), and at the Florence Correctional Center in Florence, Arizona, both CCA properties. The State of Vermont also formally contracted with the GEO Group and transferred out-of-state prisoners to the North Lake Correctional Facility in Michigan.

The State of Vermont now contracts with CoreCivic to house inmates out of state at Tallahatchie County Correctional Facility in Mississippi.

Probation and parole offices

There are 13 community-based probation and parole offices throughout the state of Vermont. These are under the administrative jurisdiction of the Vermont Department of Corrections. The offices are located in Barre, Bennington, Brattleboro, Burlington, Chelsea (sub-office in Hartford District), Hartford, Middlebury (sub-office to Rutland), Morrisville, Newport, Rutland, St. Albans, St. Johnsbury, and Springfield.

Fallen officers
Since the establishment of the Vermont Department of Corrections, two officers have died in the line of duty.

See also

Vermont Treatment Program for Sexual Abusers
List of law enforcement agencies in Vermont
Crime in Vermont

References

External links
 Official site
 Officer that died in the line of duty - Vermont DOC

State corrections departments of the United States
Corrections
Corrections